Believe in Jane is the fourth studio album by Chinese singer Jane Zhang, released on February 2, 2010 by Universal Music China.

Track listing 
 Intro (1:08)
 Hot (3:39)
 I Believe (4:43)
 It Will Be Just Fine (3:57)
 I Do (3:31)
 If This Is Love (4:42)
 Happy (3:29)
 Can't Do It feat. Da Mouth (3:16)
 Low-High (1:35)
 I Don't Wanna Pray (3:31)
 We All Live Up to Love (3:53)
 Needing You (4:38)
 Mulan Star (4:58) (Bonus track)
 Dreaming (4:17) (Bonus track)
 Courageous Love (4:15) (Hong Kong & Taiwan versions bonus track)

References 

2010 albums
Jane Zhang albums